Claude Javeau (22 September 1940 – 12 August 2021) was a Belgian sociologist and professor.

He studied at the Solvay Brussels School of Economics and Management. He was a professor of sociology at the Université libre de Bruxelles from 1987 to 2005. He also succeeded  as the university's Director of the Center for General Sociology. He was a guest professor at multiple universities.

Claude Javeau died in Brussels on 12 August 2021 at the age of 80.

Publications
La société au jour le jour : écrits sur la vie quotidienne (1991)
L’enquête par questionnaire. Manuel à l’usage du praticien (1992)
Leçons de sociologie (1997)
Six novelettes obliques (1997)
Prendre le futile au sérieux (1998)
Deux images et le désir (1999)
Dieu est-il gnangnan? (1999)
Le Petit Murmure et le Bruit du monde (1999)
Esquisse d'une histoire naturelle du plouc (2000)
Mourir (2000)
Le Bricolage du social. Un traité de sociologie (2001)
Se perd(u)re(r) (2001)
La Culotte de Madonna (2001)
L'Éloge de l'élitisme (2002)
Fragments d'une philosophie de la parfaite banalité (2002)
Petit manuel d'épistémologie des sciences du social (2003)
Des Impostures sociologiques (2014)
Je hais le football (2015)

References

1940 births
2021 deaths
Belgian sociologists
People from Liège
Academic staff of the Université libre de Bruxelles